USRC Seminole was a , 845-ton United States Revenue Cutter Service steamer constructed by the Columbian Iron Works in Baltimore, Maryland for $141,000. She was commissioned in 1900 and saw service through 1934, when she was transferred to the Federal Emergency Relief Administration.

Construction

Career
Seminole was first based out of Boston and she patrolled the New England coast and the North Atlantic. Her winter cruising area included assisting fishing vessels in the ice of Newfoundland. She transferred to Staten Island, New York on 22 May 1904 and transferred again to Wilmington, North Carolina, arriving on 5 July 1905. Her patrol area included the southeastern coast, as well as winter cruises from Cape Hatteras, North Carolina to Charleston, South Carolina and even down through Key West, Florida.  Her duties included derelict destruction, attending local ceremonies, patrolling regattas, and rendering assistance when needed such as the 4 January 1914 rescue of schooner Thomas Winsmore. Winsmore was caught in a gale that forced her to shore where she was taking on water in the hold. Seminole spotted the distressed Winsmore and came to its aid by passing a hawser and towing her to a safe anchorage. When the captain of Seminole learned that the master of Winsmore believed that a mutiny of his crew was likely, armed crew of the Seminole were put aboard Winsmore to stop a possible mutiny. On 9 April 1914 she assisted schooner  that had been stranded on the bar at Little River Inlet on 29 March.

With the outbreak of World War I in August 1914, USRC Seminole enforced the neutrality laws of the United States until the United States entered the war in April 1917.  She then served under the Navy and patrolled off the Carolinas.  In 1923 she was detached to Puerto Rico where she served as an independent unit and returned to her permanent station of Wilmington later that year.

The Spanish steamer  rescued them. On 6 March, Seminole sank Cabo Hatteras with gunfire.

In 1929 Seminole transferred for service on the Great Lakes. She was stationed at Sault Ste. Marie, Michigan until she was decommissioned in 1934.

Notes

Footnotes

Citations

References

  
  
  
 
U.S. Coast Guard.  Record of Movements: Vessels of the United States Coast Guard: 1790 - December 31, 1933.  Washington, DC: U.S. Government Printing Office, 1934; 1989 (reprint)

Ships of the United States Revenue Cutter Service
Ships built in Baltimore
1899 ships
Maritime incidents in 1927